Geronimo Stilton (also known as The New Adventures of Geronimo Stilton in season 3) is an animated children's television series based on the book series of the same name. The series debuted on Rai 2 in Italy on September 15, 2009.

Series overview

Episodes

Season 1

Season 2

Season 3

Notes

References

Lists of American children's animated television series episodes
Lists of French animated television series episodes
Lists of Italian animated television series episodes